Alicetown is a central suburb of Lower Hutt located at the bottom of the North Island of New Zealand.

The suburb is situated north of the major suburb of Petone and west of the Lower Hutt CBD. Its boundaries are the Ewen Bridge that crosses the Hutt River, New Zealand to the east, the Western Hutt Rd/Melling Railway track to the west, Wakefield St/Hutt Railway track to the south and Railway Ave to the north.

History and culture

Aglionby, on what is now Tama Street, became the first European settlement in the Hutt Valley in 1840. The Aglionby Arms, the valley's first hotel, was built in Alicetown in 1840 and relocated in 1847. Alicetown began as a farming settlement and was settled from the early 1900s by Petone factory workers.

Alicetown was named for Alice Maud Fitzherbert, the daughter of mayor William Fitzherbert who married Professor George William von Zedlitz in 1905.   

Te Tatau o Te Pō Marae was established in Alicetown in 1933. It is a marae (tribal meeting ground) of Taranaki Whānui ki te Upoko o te Ika and Te Āti Awa and includes Te Tatau o Te Pō wharenui (meeting house).

Demographics

Alicetown-Melling had a population of 2,793 at the 2018 New Zealand census, an increase of 93 people (3.4%) since the 2013 census, and an increase of 258 people (10.2%) since the 2006 census. There were 1,056 households. There were 1,422 males and 1,368 females, giving a sex ratio of 1.04 males per female. The median age was 35.8 years (compared with 37.4 years nationally), with 510 people (18.3%) aged under 15 years, 609 (21.8%) aged 15 to 29, 1,416 (50.7%) aged 30 to 64, and 255 (9.1%) aged 65 or older.

Ethnicities were 67.2% European/Pākehā, 11.6% Māori, 6.9% Pacific peoples, 22.4% Asian, and 2.4% other ethnicities (totals add to more than 100% since people could identify with multiple ethnicities).

The proportion of people born overseas was 29.5%, compared with 27.1% nationally.

Although some people objected to giving their religion, 47.3% had no religion, 33.0% were Christian, 7.7% were Hindu, 0.9% were Muslim, 1.8% were Buddhist and 3.8% had other religions.

Of those at least 15 years old, 687 (30.1%) people had a bachelor or higher degree, and 306 (13.4%) people had no formal qualifications. The median income was $40,300, compared with $31,800 nationally. The employment status of those at least 15 was that 1,362 (59.7%) people were employed full-time, 303 (13.3%) were part-time, and 87 (3.8%) were unemployed.

Education

Alicetown has two schools:
  Hutt Central School is a state contributing primary (Year 1–6) school in northern Alicetown, and has  students as of 
 Te Kura Kaupapa Māori o Te Ara Whanui is a state Māori-immersion full primary (Year 1–8) school in Victoria Street, southern Alicetown, and has  students as of 

The nearest state intermediate (Year 7–8) school is Hutt Intermediate School, and the nearest state secondary (Year 9–13) school is Hutt Valley High 
School, both across the Hutt River in neighbouring Woburn.

References

Suburbs of Lower Hutt
Populated places on Te Awa Kairangi / Hutt River